The men's 400 metres hurdles event at the 2000 Asian Athletics Championships was held in Jakarta, Indonesia on 29–31 August.

Medalists

Results

Heats

Final

References

2000 Asian Athletics Championships
400 metres hurdles at the Asian Athletics Championships